Kostakis (Greek: Κωστάκης) is a given name and surname. Notable people bearing it include:

Charis Kostakis (born 1990), Greek professional footballer
Kostakis Artymatas (born 1993), Cypriot professional footballer
Kostakis Konstantinou (born 1968), Cypriot professional footballer
Kostakis Pierides (born 1940), Cypriot professional footballer
Nikos Kostakis (born 1973), Greek professional footballer
Will Kostakis (born 1989), Australian author and journalist
George Costakis (1913-1990), collector of Russian avant-garde art

See also
Anastasia Kostaki

Greek masculine given names
Greek-language surnames